

Events

Pre-1600
AD 37 – Roman emperor Caligula accepts the titles of the Principate, bestowed on him by the Senate.
 193 – After assassinating the Roman Emperor Pertinax, his Praetorian Guards auction off the throne to Didius Julianus.
 364 – Roman Emperor Valentinian I appoints his brother Flavius Valens co-emperor.
1566 – The foundation stone of Valletta, Malta's capital city, is laid by Jean Parisot de Valette, Grand Master of the Sovereign Military Order of Malta.

1601–1900
1776 – Juan Bautista de Anza finds the site for the Presidio of San Francisco.
1795 – Partitions of Poland: The Duchy of Courland and Semigallia, a northern fief of the Polish–Lithuanian Commonwealth, ceases to exist and becomes part of Imperial Russia.
1801 – Treaty of Florence is signed, ending the war between the French Republic and the Kingdom of Naples.
1802 – Heinrich Wilhelm Matthäus Olbers discovers 2 Pallas, the second asteroid ever to be discovered.
1809 – Peninsular War: France defeats Spain in the Battle of Medellín.
1814 – War of 1812: In the Battle of Valparaíso, two American naval vessels are captured by two Royal Navy vessels.
1842 – First concert of the Vienna Philharmonic Orchestra, conducted by Otto Nicolai.
1854 – Crimean War: France and Britain declare war on Russia.
1860 – First Taranaki War: The Battle of Waireka begins.
1862 – American Civil War: In the Battle of Glorieta Pass, Union forces stop the Confederate invasion of the New Mexico Territory. The battle began on March 26.

1901–present
1910 – Henri Fabre becomes the first person to fly a seaplane, the Fabre Hydravion, after taking off from a water runway near in France.
1918 – General John J. Pershing, during World War I, cancels 42nd 'Rainbow' Division's orders to Rolampont for further training and diverted it to the occupy the Baccarat sector. Rainbow Division becomes "the first American division to take over an entire sector on its own, which it held longer than any other American division-occupied sector alone for a period of three months".
  1918   – Finnish Civil War: On the so-called "Bloody Maundy Thursday of Tampere", the Whites force the Reds to attack the city center, where the city's fiercest battles being fought in Kalevankangas with large casualties on both sides. During the same day, an explosion at the Red headquarters of Tampere kills several commanders.
1920 – Palm Sunday tornado outbreak of 1920 affects the Great Lakes region and Deep South states.
1933 – The Imperial Airways biplane City of Liverpool is believed to be the first airliner lost to sabotage when a passenger sets a fire on board.
1939 – Spanish Civil War: Generalissimo Francisco Franco conquers Madrid after a three-year siege.
1941 – World War II: First day of the Battle of Cape Matapan in Greece between the navies of the United Kingdom and Australia, and the Royal Italian navy.
1942 – World War II: A British combined force permanently disables the Louis Joubert Lock in Saint-Nazaire in order to keep the German battleship Tirpitz away from the mid-ocean convoy lanes.
1946 – Cold War: The United States Department of State releases the Acheson–Lilienthal Report, outlining a plan for the international control of nuclear power.
1959 – The State Council of the People's Republic of China dissolves the government of Tibet.
1965 – An  7.4 earthquake in Chile sets off a series of tailings dam failures, burying the town of El Cobre and killing at least 500 people.
1968 – Brazilian high school student Edson Luís de Lima Souto is killed by military police at a student protest.
1969 – Greek poet and Nobel Prize laureate Giorgos Seferis makes a famous statement on the BBC World Service opposing the junta in Greece.
1970 – An earthquake strikes western Turkey at about 23:05 local time, killing 1,086 and injuring at least 1,200.
1978 – The US Supreme Court hands down 5–3 decision in Stump v. Sparkman, a controversial case involving involuntary sterilization and judicial immunity.
1979 – A coolant leak at the Three Mile Island's Unit 2 nuclear reactor outside Harrisburg, Pennsylvania leads to the core overheating and a partial meltdown.
  1979   – The British House of Commons passes a vote of no confidence against James Callaghan's government by 1 vote, precipitating a general election.
1990 – United States President George H. W. Bush posthumously awards Jesse Owens the Congressional Gold Medal.
1994 – In South Africa, African National Congress security guards kill dozens of Inkatha Freedom Party protesters.
1999 – Kosovo War: Serb paramilitary and military forces kill at least 130 Kosovo Albanians in Izbica.
2001 – Athens International Airport Eleftherios Venizelos begins operation.
2003 – In a friendly fire incident, two American A-10 Thunderbolt II aircraft attack British tanks participating in the 2003 invasion of Iraq, killing one soldier.
2005 – An earthquake shakes northern Sumatra with a magnitude of 8.6 and killing over 1000 people.
2006 – At least one million union members, students and unemployed take to the streets in France in protest at the government's proposed First Employment Contract law.

Births

Pre-1600
1472 – Fra Bartolomeo, Italian painter (d. 1517)
1515 – Teresa of Ávila, Spanish nun and saint (d. 1582)
1522 – Albert Alcibiades, German prince (d. 1557)
1592 – John Amos Comenius, Czech bishop and educator (d. 1670)

1601–1900
1613 – Empress Dowager Xiaozhuang of China (d. 1688)
1638 – Frederik Ruysch, Dutch botanist and anatomist (d. 1731)
1652 – Samuel Sewall, English judge (d. 1730)
1725 – Andrew Kippis, English minister and author (d. 1795)
1727 – Maximilian III Joseph, Elector of Bavaria, (d. 1777)
1750 – Francisco de Miranda, Venezuelan general and politician (d. 1816)
1760 – Thomas Clarkson, English activist (d. 1846)
1793 – Henry Schoolcraft, American geographer, geologist, and ethnologist (d. 1864)
1795 – Georg Heinrich Pertz, German historian and author (d. 1876)
1806 – Thomas Hare, English lawyer and political scientist (d. 1891)
1811 – John Neumann, Czech-American bishop and saint (d. 1860)
1815 – Arsène Houssaye, French author and poet (d. 1896)
1818 – Wade Hampton III, American general and politician, 77th Governor of South Carolina (d. 1902)
1819 – Joseph Bazalgette, English architect and engineer (d. 1891)
1832 – Henry D. Washburn, American politician and general (d. 1871)
1836 – Emmanuel Benner, French artist (d. 1896)
1836 – Jean Benner, French artist (d. 1906)
1836 – Frederick Pabst, German-American brewer, founded the Pabst Brewing Company (d. 1904)
1840 – Emin Pasha, German-Jewish Egyptian physician and politician (d. 1892)
1847 – Gyula Farkas, Hungarian mathematician and physicist (d. 1930)
1849 – James Darmesteter, French historian and author (d. 1894)
1850 – Kyrle Bellew, English theatre actor (d. 1911)
1851 – Bernardino Machado, Portuguese academic and politician, 3rd President of Portugal (d. 1944)
1862 – Aristide Briand, French politician, Prime Minister of France, Nobel Prize laureate (d. 1932)
1868 – Maxim Gorky, Russian novelist, short story writer, and playwright (d. 1936)
1873 – John Geiger, American rower (d. 1956)
1879 – Terence MacSwiney, Irish republican politician and hunger striker; Lord Mayor of Cork (d. 1920)
1881 – Martin Sheridan, Irish-American discus thrower and jumper (d. 1918)
1884 – Angelos Sikelianos, Greek poet and playwright (d. 1951)
1887 – Beulah Dark Cloud, American actress (d. 1945)
1890 – Paul Whiteman, American violinist, composer, and bandleader (d. 1967)
1892 – Corneille Heymans, Belgian physiologist and academic, Nobel Prize laureate (d. 1968)
  1892   – Tom Maguire, Irish republican General (d. 1993)
1893 – Spyros Skouras, Greek-American businessman (d. 1971)
1894 – Ernst Lindemann, German captain (d. 1941)
1895 – Christian Herter, American politician, United States Secretary of State (d. 1966)
  1895   – Donald Grey Barnhouse, American pastor and theologian (d. 1960)
  1895   – Spencer W. Kimball, American religious leader, 12th President of The Church of Jesus Christ of Latter-day Saints (d. 1985)
1897 – Sepp Herberger, German footballer and manager (d. 1977)
1899 – Gussie Busch, American businessman (d. 1989)
  1899   – Buck Shaw, American football player and coach (d. 1977)
1900 – Edward Wagenknecht, American critic and educator (d. 2004)

1901–present
1902 – Flora Robson, English actress (d. 1984)
1903 – Rudolf Serkin, Czech-American pianist and educator (d. 1991)
1904 – Margaret Tucker, Australian author and activist (d. 1996)
1905 – Pandro S. Berman, American production manager and producer (d. 1996)
  1905   – Marlin Perkins, American zoologist and television host (d. 1986)
1906 – Murray Adaskin, Canadian violinist, composer, and conductor (d. 2002)
  1906   – Robert Allen, American actor (d. 1998)
  1906   – Dorothy Knowles, South African-English author, fencer and academic (d. 2010)
1907 – Irving Paul Lazar, American lawyer and talent agent (d. 1993)
1909 – Nelson Algren, American novelist and short story writer (d. 1981)
1910 – Jimmie Dodd, American actor and singer-songwriter (d. 1964)
  1910   – Ingrid of Sweden, Queen of Denmark (d. 2000)
1911 – Consalvo Sanesi, Italian race car driver (d. 1998)
1912 – A. Bertram Chandler, English-Australian author (d. 1984)
  1912   – Marina Raskova, Russian pilot and navigator (d. 1943)
1913 – Toko Shinoda, Japanese artist (d. 2021)
1914 – Edward Anhalt, American screenwriter and producer (d. 2000)
  1914   – Bohumil Hrabal, Czech author (d. 1997)
  1914   – Edmund Muskie, American politician, 58th United States Secretary of State (d. 1996)
  1914   – Everett Ruess, American explorer, poet, and painter (d. 1934)
1915 – Jay Livingston, American singer-songwriter (d. 2001)
1919 – Tom Brooks, Australian cricket umpire (d. 2007)
  1919   – Eileen Crofton, British physician and author (d. 2010)
  1919   – Vic Raschi, American baseball player and coach (d. 1988)
1921 – Harold Agnew, American physicist and academic (d. 2013)
  1921   – Dirk Bogarde, English actor and author (d. 1999)
1922 – Neville Bonner, Australian politician (d. 1999)
  1922   – Grace Hartigan, American painter and educator (d. 2008)
  1922   – Joey Maxim, American boxer and actor (d. 2001)
1923 – Paul C. Donnelly, American scientist and engineer (d. 2014)
  1923   – Thad Jones, American trumpet player and composer (d. 1986)
1924 – Freddie Bartholomew, American actor (d. 1992)
1925 – Innokenty Smoktunovsky, Russian actor (d. 1994)
  1925   – Dorothy DeBorba, American child actress (d. 2010)
1926 – Cayetana Fitz-James Stuart, 18th Duchess of Alba (d. 2014)
  1926   – Polly Umrigar, Indian cricketer (d. 2006)
1928 – Zbigniew Brzezinski, Polish-American political activist and analyst; United States National Security Advisor (d. 2017)
  1928   – Alexander Grothendieck, German-French mathematician and theorist (d. 2014)
1930 – Robert Ashley, American composer (d. 2014)
  1930   – Jerome Isaac Friedman, American physicist and academic, Nobel Prize laureate
1933 – Frank Murkowski, American soldier, banker, and politician, 8th Governor of Alaska
1934 – Laurie Taitt, Guyanese-English hurdler (d. 2006)
1935 – Michael Parkinson, English journalist and author
  1935   – Józef Szmidt, Polish triple jumper
1936 – Mario Vargas Llosa, Peruvian writer and politician, Nobel Prize laureate
1940 – Tony Barber, English-Australian television host
  1940   – Luis Cubilla, Uruguayan footballer and coach (d. 2013)
1942 – Daniel Dennett, American philosopher and academic
  1942   – Neil Kinnock, Welsh politician, Vice-President of the European Commission
  1942   – Mike Newell, English director and producer
  1942   – Samuel Ramey, American opera singer
  1942   – Jerry Sloan, American basketball player and coach (d. 2020)
1943 – Richard Eyre, English director, producer, and screenwriter
  1943   – Conchata Ferrell, American actress (d. 2020)
1944 – Rick Barry, American basketball player
  1944   – Ken Howard, American actor (d. 2016)
1945 – Rodrigo Duterte, Filipino politician, 16th President of the Philippines
1946 – Wubbo Ockels, Dutch physicist and astronaut (d. 2014)
  1946   – Henry Paulson, American banker and politician, 74th United States Secretary of the Treasury
  1946   – Alejandro Toledo, Peruvian economist and politician, President of Peru
1948 – Janice Lynde, American actress
  1948   – Dianne Wiest, American actress
  1948   – Milan Williams, American keyboard player (d. 2006)
1949 – Ronnie Ray Smith, American sprinter (d. 2013)
1953 – Melchior Ndadaye, Burundian banker and politician, 4th President of Burundi (d. 1993)
1954 – Donald Brown, American pianist and educator
1955 – Reba McEntire, American singer-songwriter and actress
1957 – Harvey Glance, American sprinter
1958 – Edesio Alejandro, Cuban composer
  1958   – Curt Hennig, American wrestler (d. 2003)
1959 – Laura Chinchilla, Costa Rican politician, President of Costa Rica
1960 – José Maria Neves, Cape Verdeian politician, Prime Minister of Cape Verde
1961 – Byron Scott, American basketball player and coach
1962 – Jure Franko, Slovenian skier
  1962   – Simon Bazalgette, English businessman
1964 – Karen Lumley, English politician
1968 – Iris Chang, Chinese-American journalist and author (d. 2004)
  1968   – Nasser Hussain, Indian-English cricketer
1969 – Brett Ratner, American director and producer
1970 – Vince Vaughn, American actor
  1970   – Jennifer Weiner, American journalist and author
1972 – Keith Tkachuk, American ice hockey player
1973 – Björn Kuipers, Dutch footballer and referee
  1973   – Umaga, American Samoan wrestler (d. 2009)
1975 – Kate Gosselin, American television personality
  1975   – Iván Helguera, Spanish footballer
1978 – Nathan Cayless, Australian-New Zealand rugby league player and coach
1979 – Shakib Khan, Bangladeshi film actor, producer, singer and media personality
1980 – Stiliani Pilatou, Greek long jumper 
  1980   – Luke Walton, American basketball player
1981 – Edwar Ramírez, American baseball player
  1981   – Julia Stiles, American actress
1983 – Ladji Doucouré, French sprinter and hurdler
1984 – Christopher Samba, Congolese footballer
1985 – Stefano Ferrario, Italian footballer
  1985   – Steve Mandanda, French footballer
  1985   – Stanislas Wawrinka, Swiss tennis player
1986 – Mustafa Ali, American wrestler
  1986   – Bowe Bergdahl, American sergeant
  1986   – Lady Gaga, American singer-songwriter and actress
  1986   – J-Kwon, American rapper
  1986   – Barbora Strýcová, Czech tennis player
1987 – Jean-Paul Adela, Seychellois footballer
  1987   – Yohan Benalouane, French-Tunisian footballer
  1987   – Simeon Jackson, Canadian soccer player
  1987   – Jonathan Van Ness, American hairdresser and television personality
1988 – Geno Atkins, American football player
  1988   – Ryan Kalish, American baseball player
1989 – Lukas Jutkiewicz, English footballer
  1989   – Mira Leung, Canadian figure skater
1990 – Delroy Edwards, American musician
  1990   – Laura Harrier, American actress and model
1991 – Derek Carr, American football player
  1991   – Jordan McRae, American basketball player
  1991   – Lisa-Maria Moser, Austrian tennis player
  1991   – Marie-Philip Poulin, Canadian ice hockey player
  1991   – Ondřej Palát, Czech ice hockey player
1992 – Sergi Gómez, Spanish footballer
1995 – Jonathan Drouin, Canadian ice hockey player
1996 – Matt Renshaw, English-Australian cricketer
1998 – Lance Morris, Australian cricketer
2001 – Xiyu Wang, Chinese tennis player
2004 – Anna Shcherbakova, Russian figure skater

Deaths

Pre-1600
 193 – Pertinax, Roman emperor (b. 126)
 592 – Guntram, French king (b. 532)
 966 – Flodoard, Frankish canon and chronicler
1072 – Ordulf, Duke of Saxony
1134 – Stephen Harding, founder of the Cistercian order
1239 – Emperor Go-Toba of Japan (b. 1180)
1241 – Valdemar II of Denmark (b. 1170)
1285 – Pope Martin IV
1346 – Venturino of Bergamo, Dominican preacher (b. 1304)
1563 – Heinrich Glarean, Swiss poet and theorist (b. 1488)
1566 – Sigismund von Herberstein, Austrian historian and diplomat (b. 1486)
1584 – Ivan the Terrible, Russian king (b. 1530)

1601–1900
1687 – Constantijn Huygens, Dutch poet and composer (b. 1596)
1690 – Emmanuel Tzanes, Greek Renaissance painter (b. 1610) 
1818 – Antonio Capuzzi, Italian violinist and composer (b. 1755)
1822 – Angelis Govios, leader of the Greek War of Independence (b. 1780) 
1868 – James Brudenell, 7th Earl of Cardigan, English lieutenant and politician (b. 1797)
1870 – George Henry Thomas, American general (b. 1816)
1874 – Peter Andreas Hansen, Danish-German astronomer and mathematician (b. 1795)
1881 – Modest Mussorgsky, Russian pianist and composer (b. 1839)
1884 – Georgios Zariphis, Greek banker and financier (b. 1810) 
1893 – Edmund Kirby Smith, American general (b. 1824)
1900 – Piet Joubert, South African soldier and politician (b. c.1831)

1901–present
1910 – Édouard Colonne, French violinist and conductor (b. 1838)
1916 – James Strachan-Davidson, English classical scholar, academic administrator, translator, and author (b. 1843)
1917 – Albert Pinkham Ryder, American painter (b. 1847)
1923 – Charles Hubbard, American archer (b. 1849)
1929 – Katharine Lee Bates, American poet and songwriter (b. 1859)
  1929   – Lomer Gouin, Canadian lawyer and politician, Premier of Quebec (b. 1861)
1934 – Mahmoud Mokhtar, Egyptian sculptor and educator (b. 1891)
1941 – Marcus Hurley, American basketball player and cyclist (b. 1883)
  1941   – Virginia Woolf, English writer (b. 1882)
1942 – Miguel Hernández, Spanish poet and playwright (b. 1910)
1943 – Sergei Rachmaninoff, Russian pianist, composer, and conductor (b. 1873)
1944 – Stephen Leacock, English-Canadian political scientist and author (b. 1869)
1947 – Karol Świerczewski, Polish general (b. 1897)
1953 – Jim Thorpe, American football player (b. 1887)
1957 – Stylianos Lenas, Greek-Cypriot member of the National Organisation of Cypriot Fighters (EOKA) against the British rule (b. 1931) 
1958 – W. C. Handy, American trumpet player and composer (b. 1873)
1962 – Hugo Wast, Argentinian author (b. 1883)
1963 – Antonius Bouwens, Dutch target shooter (b. 1876)
1965 – Clemence Dane, English author and playwright (b. 1888)
1969 – Dwight D. Eisenhower, American general and politician, 34th President of the United States (b. 1890)
1972 – Donie Bush, American baseball player, manager, and team owner (b. 1887)
1974 – Arthur Crudup, American singer-songwriter and guitarist (b. 1905)
  1974   – Dorothy Fields, American songwriter (b. 1905)
  1974   – Françoise Rosay, French actress (b. 1891)
1976 – Richard Arlen, American actor (b. c.1898)
1977 – Eric Shipton, English mountaineer and explorer (b. 1907)
1979 – Emmett Kelly, American clown and actor (b. 1898)
1980 – Dick Haymes, Argentinian-American actor and singer (b. 1918)
1982 – William Giauque, Canadian chemist and academic, Nobel Prize laureate (b. 1895)
1985 – Marc Chagall, Russian-French painter (b. 1887)
1986 – Virginia Gilmore. American actress (b. 1919)
1987 – Maria von Trapp, Austrian-American singer (b. 1905)
1992 – Nikolaos Platon, Greek archaeologist (b. 1909) 
1994 – Eugène Ionesco, Romanian-French playwright and critic (b. 1909)
1996 – Shin Kanemaru, Japanese politician, Deputy Prime Minister of Japan (b. 1914)
2000 – Anthony Powell, English soldier and author (b. 1905)
2004 – Peter Ustinov, English-Swiss actor, director, producer, and screenwriter (b. 1921)
2005 – Moura Lympany, English-Monacan pianist (b. 1916)
  2005   – Robin Spry, Canadian director, producer, and screenwriter (b. 1939)
2006 – Pro Hart, Australian painter (b. 1928)
  2006   – Charles Schepens, Belgian-American ophthalmologist and author (b. 1912)
  2006   – Caspar Weinberger, American captain, lawyer, and politician, 15th United States Secretary of Defense (b. 1917)
2009 – Maurice Jarre, French-American composer and conductor (b. 1924)
  2009   – Janet Jagan, 6th President of Guyana (b. 1920)
2010 – June Havoc, American actress, dancer, and director (b. 1912)
2012 – John Arden, English author and playwright (b. 1930)
  2012   – Ioannis Banias, Greek politician (b. 1939) 
  2012   – Harry Crews, American novelist (b. 1935)
  2012   – Addie L. Wyatt, African American labor leader (b. 1924)
2013 – George E. P. Box, English-American statistician and educator (b. 1919)
  2013   – Richard Griffiths, English actor (b. 1947)
  2013   – Hugh McCracken, American guitarist, harmonica player, and producer (b. 1942)
  2013   – Bob Teague, American college football star and television news-reporter (b. 1929)
  2013   – Gus Triandos, American baseball player and scout (b. 1930)
2014 – Jeremiah Denton, American admiral and politician (b. 1924)
  2014   – Lorenzo Semple, Jr., American screenwriter and producer (b. 1923)
2015 – Chuck Brayton, American baseball player and coach (b. 1925)
  2015   – Joseph Cassidy, Canadian-English priest and academic (b. 1954)
  2015   – Miroslav Ondříček, Czech cinematographer (b. 1934)
  2015   – Gene Saks, American actor and director (b. 1921)
2016 – James Noble, American actor (b. 1922)
2021 – Didier Ratsiraka, Malagasy politician and naval officer (b. 1936)

Holidays and observances
Christian feast day:
Priscus
Pope Sixtus III
March 28 (Eastern Orthodox liturgics)
Serfs Emancipation Day (Tibet)
Teachers' Day (Czech Republic and Slovakia)

References

External links

 BBC: On This Day
 
 Historical Events on March 28

Days of the year
March